= Ali Ili =

Major tribal division in Turkmenistan

The Ali Ili were one of the ten major tribal divisions in Turkmenistan. Prior to the rise of the Soviet Union, they considered themselves to be a distinct ethnic group. However, the Soviets pressured them into the category of Turkmen.
